Kurachevo (Quras) is a rural locality (a village) in Kundashlinsky Selsoviet, Baltachevsky District, Bashkortostan, Russia. The population was 226 as of 2010. There are 6 streets.

Geography 
Kurachevo is located 31 km southeast of Starobaltachevo (the district's administrative centre) by road. Novosultangulovo is the nearest rural locality.

References 

Rural localities in Baltachevsky District